Flat Rock is an unincorporated community in Stokes County, North Carolina, United States, approximately five miles east of the town of Pilot Mountain.

It is one of three places in North Carolina named Flat Rock.

Unincorporated communities in Stokes County, North Carolina
Unincorporated communities in North Carolina